Stephen T. Ziliak (born October 17, 1963) is an American professor of economics whose research and essays span disciplines from statistics and beer brewing to medicine and poetry. He is currently a faculty member of the Angiogenesis Foundation, conjoint professor of business and law at the University of Newcastle in Australia, and professor of economics at Roosevelt University in Chicago, IL. He previously taught for the Georgia Institute of Technology, Emory University, and Bowling Green State University. Much of his work has focused on welfare and poverty, rhetoric, public policy, and the history and philosophy of science and statistics. Most known for his works in the field of statistical significance, Ziliak gained notoriety from his 1996 article, "The Standard Error of Regressions", from a sequel study in 2004 called "Size Matters", and for his University of Michigan Press best-selling and critically acclaimed book The Cult of Statistical Significance: How the Standard Error Costs Us Jobs, Justice, and Lives (2008) all coauthored with Deirdre McCloskey.

Career

Ziliak received a B.A. in Economics from Indiana University, a PhD in Economics, and a PhD Certificate in the Rhetoric of the Human Sciences, both from the University of Iowa. While at Iowa, he served as resident scholar in the Project on Rhetoric of Inquiry, where he met among others Steve Fuller, Bruno Latour, and Wayne C. Booth, and co-authored the now-famous paper "The Standard Error of Regressions".

Following the completion of his PhD degrees, he has taught at Bowling Green, Emory, Georgia Tech, and (currently) Roosevelt University, and he has been a visiting professor at more than a dozen other leading universities, law schools, and medical centers across the United States and Europe. In 2002 he won the Helen Potter Award for Best Article in Social Economics ("Pauper Fiction in Economic Science: `Paupers in Almshouses' and the Odd Fit of Oliver Twist"). In that same year at Georgia Tech he won the "Faculty Member of the Year" award and in 2003 he was voted "Most Intellectual Professor".

After college, but prior to his academic career, Ziliak served as county welfare caseworker and, following that, labor market analyst for the Indiana Department of Workforce Development, both in Indianapolis.

Work on rhetoric and statistical significance

While at Iowa, Ziliak became friends with his dissertation adviser, Deirdre McCloskey. He and McCloskey shared an interest in the fields of rhetoric and statistical significance — namely how the two concepts merge in modern economics. Ziliak had discovered one big cost of the "significance mistake" early on in his job with Workforce Development, in 1987. By U.S. Department of Labor policy he learned he was not allowed to publish black youth unemployment rates for Indiana's labor markets: "not statistically significant," the Labor Department said, meaning the p-values exceeded 0.10 (p less than or equal to 0.10 was the Labor Department's bright line cut-off for publishing estimates).

In their paper, "The Standard Error of Regressions," McCloskey and Ziliak argue that econometrics greatly over-values and vastly misuses statistical significance testing — Student's t-test. They claim econometricians rely too heavily on statistical significance, but too little on actual economic significance. Significance does not mean importance, and lack of significance does not mean unimportant. The paper also reviews and critiques over 40 years' worth of published papers in economic journals to see if and how ambiguity and misuse of statistical significance affect the author's article.

In a reply to critics, Ziliak and McCloskey did a follow-up study of the 1996 research and found that the significance problem had grown even larger, causing false inferences and decisions in from 70% in the 1980s to 80% of the 1990s articles published in the American Economic Review.  "Size Matters: The Standard Error of Regressions in the American Economic Review" was presented by Ziliak at the 2004 meetings of the American Economic Association, in a standing-room only plenary session with over 350 economists and journalists, chaired by Nobel laureate Kenneth Arrow.  The article and a reply to critics ("Significance Redux") were published in a special issue of the Journal of Socio-Economics, together with favorable comments from Nobel laureate Clive Granger, Arnold Zellner, Edward Leamer, Gerd Gigerenzer, Jeffrey Wooldridge, Joel Horowitz and a half dozen others. In 2004 "Size Matters" also inspired a comment from Nobel laureate Thomas Schelling. Published cooperatively at the same time in Econ Journal Watch (2004), "Size Matters" maintains its rank as one of the top-most downloaded articles in that journal's history (over 25,000 complete downloads as of November 2015).

Ziliak was a lead author on the twenty-four statistician team which crafted in 2015-2016 the historic "American Statistical Association Statement on Statistical Significance and P-Values," edited by Ronald Wasserstein and Nicole Lazar.

His article "How Large are Your G-values? Try Gosset's Guinnessometrics When a Little 'p' Is Not Enough" was published in a follow-up special issue of The American Statistician (2019 73 sup1), a major re-think of statistical testing, estimation, and reporting in "A world beyond p<0.05" for which Ziliak also served as associate editor.

The Cult of Statistical Significance 
His book, The Cult of Statistical Significance: How the Standard Error Costs Us Jobs, Justice, and Lives (2008) challenges the history, philosophy, and practice of all the testing sciences, from economics to medicine, and has been widely reviewed in journals and the media. It was the beer-brewing Gosset aka "Student", Ziliak discovered in the archives, not the biologist R. A. Fisher, who provided the firmer foundation for modern statistics, decisions, and experimental design. The book featured in a 2011 U.S. Supreme Court case, Matrixx Initiatives v. Siracusano et al., wherein the justices unanimously decided against using statistical significance as a standard for adverse event reporting in U.S. securities law.   Ziliak and McCloskey were invited to submit to the court a brief of amici curiae ("friends of the court") wherein they explain the most important differences between economic, legal, and human significance versus mere statistical significance. Ziliak wrote about the case for Significance magazine, inspiring published letters from A.W.F. Edwards and Dennis Lindley, who later befriended Ziliak in correspondence over W.S. Gosset and R.A. Fisher.

"Haiku Economics" 
In 2001, while teaching at Georgia Tech, Ziliak rediscovered his appreciation for haiku poetry.  Haiku are short lyric verse with a budget constraint, conventionally arranged in three lines of 17 sounds (5-7-and-5). He had learned about the medieval Japanese art form back in the 1980s, from a friend in Indianapolis who happened to be the eminent African American poet Etheridge Knight. Teaching large-section courses to hundreds of students, Ziliak was at the same time seeking a low-cost way to help students connect their own observations and feelings to the economics textbook and economy itself. Economics and haiku overlap at the level of principles, he discovered, yet give something more in combination, such as feelings.  Students reacted positively.  "Haiku economics" was born, and first published in 2002.  Ziliak's most famous haiku is:

Invisible hand;

mother of inflated hope,

mistress of despair!

His invisible hand haiku has been erroneously credited to Etheridge Knight and Matsuo Basho. (For example, in Kalle Lasn's Meme Wars: The Creative Destruction of Neoclassical Economics.) In 2008 and 2009 Ziliak's work on haiku economics gained international attention following a series of articles published in the Wall Street Journal, The Economist, The Chronicle of Higher Education, and National Public Radio. In 2011 he published an essay in Poetry magazine, "Haiku Economics: On Money, Metaphor, and the Invisible Hand," which the editors of Poetry cite as the most-read essay in 2011 and in the history of their non-fiction "The View from Here" column, which has featured essays by Richard Rorty, Christopher Hitchens, and many others.

Guinnessometrics 
Ziliak's current projects include Guinnessometrics, that is, a wholesale rethinking of experimental philosophy and econometric practice after William S. Gosset (1876-1937) aka "Student", the inventor of "Student's" t and celebrated Head Brewer of Guinness. Ziliak's Guinnessometrics was twice featured on BBC Radio 4's "More or Less" program, hosted by Tim Harford, and later in many other media such as The Wall Street Journal Europe, Financial Times, Salon and The Washington Post.  Guinnessometrics argues that randomization plus statistical significance does not equal validity.  Validity is proven by other means, including deliberately balanced and stratified experiments, small series of independent and repeated samples controlling for real not merely random error, and an economic approach to the logic of uncertainty.

His work showing the history and power of balanced over randomized controlled trials, rival techniques which Ziliak traces back to the early 1900s and the Guinness Brewery in Dublin, has been noted by Tim Harford, Casey Mulligan, and others for its deep challenge to randomized field experiments after John List, Steve Levitt, Esther Duflo, and others. In July 2008 Ziliak was invited by the International Biometric Society and the Irish Statistical Association to present his work in Dublin on "Guinnessometrics: The Economic Foundation of Student's t," in celebration of the 100th anniversary of W.S. Gosset's aka "Student's" t-distribution and test.  Standing on stage with Sir David Cox and Stephen Senn, the biostatistician and president of the American Statistical Association Chicago Chapter Borko Jovanovic quipped that Ziliak "looked, at first, like a little kid walking around the British Museum. Then he began to speak, which he could probably do for two weeks straight". In 2010 Ziliak and British statistician Stephen Senn exchanged views in The Lancet.

Renganomics and rap 
Ziliak's other contributions include a competitive learning game he calls renganomics. Renganomics is a combination of economic science with an ancient Japanese poetic form called renga.  The idea is to create a spontaneous, collaboratively written poem about the economy and economic science in the form of linked classical haiku poems (5-7-5 sound counts) followed by two lines of 7 sounds (14 sounds for the couplet).  The renga form, which gained the attention of Octavio Paz, is created by writing a verse and then passing the poem on to the next person in the circle, given a predetermined time constraint and stakes. The genre challenges notions of the spontaneous order and central planning alike, while allowing both policies to air ideas, desires, and complaints.

In May 2015 Ziliak produced with his students at Roosevelt University an economics rap video, "Fear the Economics Textbook (Story of the Next Crook)".  The video, featured in Inside Higher Ed, The National Review, Rethinking Economics and elsewhere, is in part a statement of Ziliak's pluralist and dialogical teaching philosophy and view of history, and at the same time a reply to the popular Keynes-Hayek rap videos.

Welfare reform 
On the strength of his dissertation, "Essays on Self-Reliance: The United States in the Era of Scientific Charity," he was appointed associate editor for the millennial edition of Historical Statistics of the United States: Colonial Times to the Present (General Eds. S. Carter, R. Sutch, et al.)  Ziliak argued in his dissertation and in a series of articles against the 1996 welfare reform act (PRWORA). He argued on the basis of novel econometric and social historical evidence he produced on previous, 19th century attempts to abolish welfare and to replace it with private charity ("scientific charity", so called). Economic theory of welfare is distorted, he argued, by a "Malthusian vice" and "Contradiction of compassion".  Private charity expanded more than previous observers predicted. But labor market outcomes were about the same as one finds in late 20th century welfare programs. His comparative historical research has challenged left and right both, from Stephen Pimpare to the Cato Institute, and has featured in encyclopedias on social work.

Ethics and economics 
Ziliak's historical research on previous attempts to privatize welfare for the poor has questioned the virtue-ethical philosophies of Victorians, Old and New, from Herbert Spencer to Gertrude Himmelfarb. In The Bourgeois Virtues (2006, xviii) his former dissertation adviser and long-time coauthor Deirdre N. McCloskey thanks Ziliak (together with Arjo Klamer and Helen McCloskey, Deirdre's mother) for "disagreeing with me about the bourgeois virtues".  The Cult of Statistical Significance drew attention to the ethics of statistical significance testing and the frequently large yet neglected consequences for human and other life when the test is misused and misinterpreted as Ziliak and McCloskey have documented it frequently is.  Haiku economics is fundamentally an attempt to bring feelings and individual experience back inside the dismal science.  In his 2011 essay on "Haiku Economics," published in Poetry magazine, Ziliak noted the influence of Adam Smith's The Theory of Moral Sentiments and John Stuart Mill's Autobiography. More recently, In a series of papers comparing Gosset's deliberately balanced experimental designs with Fisher's randomized, Ziliak argues that most randomized controlled trials lack both ethical and economic justification.  His paper "The Unprincipled Randomization Principle in Economics and Medicine" (with Edward Teather-Posadas), published in the Oxford Handbook of Professional Economic Ethics (2015), argues that most randomized controlled trials (RCTs) fail every ethical code, from Smith's "impartial spectator" and Pareto efficiency to Rawls's difference principle, except possibly "vulgar utilitarianism" (p. 436), an "ethic" which even most economists reject.

Books

The Cult of Statistical Significance: How the Standard Error Costs Us Jobs, Justice, and Lives (University of Michigan Press, 2008).  With Deirdre McCloskey.
(editor) Measurement and Meaning in Economics: The Essential Deirdre McCloskey (Edward Elgar, 2001).
The Economic Conversation (forthcoming).  With Arjo Klamer and Deirdre McCloskey.

Selected articles

Ziliak S T. (1996). The Standard Error of Regressions, Journal of Economic Literature Vol. 34 (March):97-114 (with D N McCloskey)
Ziliak S T. (2004). Size Matters: The Standard Error of Regressions in the American Economic Review, Econ Journal Watch. 1(2) 331-338 (with D N McCloskey)
Ziliak S T. (2011) Haiku Economics: On Money, Metaphor, and the Invisible Hand, Poetry CXCVII (4, Jan.): 314-316
Ziliak S T. (2008) Guinnessometrics: The Economic Foundation of Student's t, Journal of Economic Perspectives 22 (4, Fall): 199-216
Ziliak S T. (2011) W.S. Gosset and Some Neglected Concepts in Experimental Statistics: Guinnessometrics II, Journal of Wine Economics 6 (2): 252-272
Ziliak S T. (2019) How Large Are Your G-values? Try Gosset's Guinnessometrics When a Little 'p' Is Not Enough, The American Statistician 73 (sup1): 281-290
Ziliak S T. (2015) The Unprincipled Randomization Principle in Economics and Medicine, Chp. 22, pp. 423–452 in the Oxford Handbook of Professional Economic Ethics (Oxford University Press), eds.  G. DeMartino and D. McCloskey (with E. Teather-Posadas)
Ziliak S T. (2014) Balanced Versus Randomized Field Experiments in Economics: Why W.S. Gosset aka "Student" Matters, Review of Behavioral Economics 1 (No. 1-2): 167-208

Ziliak S T. (2010)  Brief of Amici Curiae Statistics Experts Professors Deirdre N. McCloskey and Stephen T. Ziliak in Support of Respondents, Matrixx Initiatives v Siracusano et al. (vol. No. 09-1156, pp. 22). Washington DC: Supreme Court of the United States. Edward Labaton et al. Counsel of Record (with D N McCloskey)

Ziliak S T. (1996) The End of Welfare and the Contradiction of Compassion, The Independent Review I (1, Spring 1996): 55–73 http://www.independent.org/publications/tir/article.asp?a=497

Ziliak S T. (2001) D. N. McCloskey and the Rhetoric of a Scientific Economics, pp. ix-xxvi, in S. T. Ziliak, ed., Measurement and Meaning in Economics (2001).
Ziliak S T. (2001) What are Models for?, In Warren J. Samuels and Jeff E. Biddle, eds., Research in the History of Economic Thought and Methodology 19-A (Elsevier Press, 2001):149–159.
Ziliak S T. (2002) Pauper Fiction in Economic Science: `Paupers in Almshouses' and the Odd Fit of Oliver Twist, Review of Social Economy 55 (2, June 2002): 159–181.
Ziliak S T. (2002) Haiku Economics, Rethinking Marxism 14 (September 2002), pp. 111–112. http://www.tandfonline.com/doi/abs/10.1080/089356902101242323
Ziliak S T (2004) The Significance of the Economics Research Paper,  In Edward Fullbrook, ed., A Guide to What's Wrong with Economics (Anthem Press 2004), Chp. 21: 223–236.

References

External links
 Stephen Ziliak's Roosevelt University Faculty Home Page
 Stephen T. Ziliak's Safe Place on the Web

1963 births
Living people
20th-century American economists
21st-century American economists
American male non-fiction writers
American rhetoricians
21st-century American non-fiction writers
21st-century American male writers
Indiana University alumni
University of Iowa alumni
Bowling Green State University faculty
Emory University faculty
Georgia Tech faculty
Roosevelt University faculty
Academic staff of the University of Newcastle (Australia)